Vigo County School Corporation (VCSC) is a school district that serves Vigo County, Indiana and is headquartered in Terre Haute. The corporation is led by superintendent Robert Haworth  and by the Board of Trustees including: President; Joseph Irwin III, Vice President; Dr. Susan Powers, Secretary; Jackie Lower, Mel Burks, Paul Lockhart, Rosemarie Scott, Joni Wise. The school board holds meetings two times a month on Mondays.

The VCSC contains one building that was once a church on the National Register of Historic Places, the Woodrow Wilson Middle School building known for its Tudor Revival architecture and large-scale interior murals by Gilbert Brown Wilson.

All enrollment data is accurate for the 2020-2021 school year from the Indiana Department of Education.

Enrollment History

Diversity

Grades PreK-5

Grades 6-8

High schools

Alternative Schools

Virtual School

Adult education
Chauncey Rose Adult Education Learning Center

References

School districts in Indiana
Education in Vigo County, Indiana
Terre Haute, Indiana